Vanir Energy is a renewable energy company located in Fletcher, North Carolina. Vanir Energy, in partnership with EnerWorks, completed in February 2009 what was then described as the world's largest solar heating and cooling installation. This system, installed in the 900000 square-foot Fletcher Business Park, consisted of 640 rooftop solar thermal collectors and two adsorption chillers with a cooling capacity of 300 tons.

References 

Solar energy companies of the United States
Renewable energy in the United States